The Albany Great Danes men's basketball team is the basketball team that represent the University at Albany, State University of New York in Albany, New York. The school's team currently competes in the America East Conference and plays its home games at SEFCU Arena. The team played in the NCAA Division I men's basketball tournament in 2006, 2007, 2013, and 2014, 2015. They also made the CIT in 2016 and 2017, and are currently coached by Dwayne Killings.

Team history

The early years: "Doc" Sauers
Richard “Doc” Sauers served as Great Danes men's basketball coach from 1955 to 1997, with a short break in the 1987–88 season. He led the program to eleven NCAA College Division/Division III and four NAIA post-season tournament appearances in his tenure. Sauers finished his career with a 702–330 record in 41 seasons. Sauers achieved the 700-win mark on February 8, 1997, in an 89–71 victory over the University of Bridgeport. He would retire one month later and be inducted into the school's Hall of Fame in 2004. A banner is flown in the rafters of the SEFCU Arena honoring Sauers accomplishment of 702 wins.

The 2005–06 season: "Why not us?"
The process to become a Division I program was slow. From the 1999–2000 season, the first year in Division I, to the end of the 2004–05 season, UAlbany recorded a 48–118 record. The team finished with over 10 victories in only two seasons. However, in the 2005–06 campaign, the Great Danes compiled a 21–11 season. In that season, the Great Danes would take on both the  Florida Gators and UCLA Bruins, who would play each other for the national championship. On March 11, 2006, the men's basketball team won the America East conference tournament, earning the school (and the SUNY system) its first ever berth to the NCAA tournament, defeating the University of Vermont 80–67 in a sold out RACC. The Great Danes were seeded #16 in the Washington, D.C., region and were matched up against top-seeded UConn. Despite the #16 seed being 0–87 before UAlbany took the floor, Head Coach Will Brown believed that his team had a chance to beat UConn in the tournament. With that, the team took the motto, "Why Not Us?".

On March 17, 2006, the Danes nearly became the first #16 seed to defeat a #1 seed in the Division I tournament. The Danes, down only 1 at the half, went on a 13–0 run early in the second half to take a double-digit lead over the Huskies. With the game televised on CBS, the Danes led 50–38 with just over 11 minutes left in the game. However, a 34–9 run by the Huskies' and stifling defense stopped the Danes' offense, the Huskies averted the upset, winning 72–59. The game against UConn gave the program instant notoriety.

The 2006–07 season: "Lucky 13"
In the 2006–07 season, the Great Danes faced a much stronger America East conference. The Great Danes would accomplish a 20–9 regular season, but be the #2 seed in the conference tournament. This forced the Great Danes to travel to Vermont, who was the #1 seed for the conference championship, and were previously 0–7. On March 10, 2007, the Danes' won their second consecutive America East title beating Vermont 60–59 in the conference final on a last second steal by Carl Ross and Brent Wilson.

The Great Danes would be seeded 13th in the South Division of the 2007 NCAA tournament. Creating a new motto "Lucky 13" which was worn on T-shirts sold on campus. On March 16, 2007, two busses carrying approximately 80 students would drive a total of 11 hours to see their Danes at the Nationwide Arena in Columbus, Ohio, to see the #13 seed lose to the #4 seed Virginia Cavaliers 84–57 in the first round of the Tournament.

Prior to the conclusion of the season, the program would retire the number 31 of player Jamar Wilson. Wilson finished his career as the school's all-time scorer with 2,164 points, plus ranked second in assists with 488. Wilson also became the first player in school history to score 500 points or more in three different seasons. He would also win two America East Player of the Year Awards, something only three other people in conference history had achieved. No athlete in the program's history has had their number retired prior.

The 2008–09 season: U Albany hosts the tourney
With only two of their remaining pieces from the "Why Not Us?" team still intact, Brian Connelly and Jimmie Covington, the Danes would look to rebuild with eight newcomers to the team. They would start the season 0–2 after matchups with Big East opponents Villanova and DePaul in "homecoming" games for their seniors. A 5–0 run after the slow start would put the Danes' in prime position to upset their crosstown rival Siena Saints, who had just endured 3 loses over 4 days at the 2008 Old Spice Classic in Orlando, Florida. However the Danes' would fall short by seven points. The Great Danes would win three of their next four games including a game postponed for snow and difficult travel conditions in Fairfield, Connecticut, against Sacred Heart before closing out the calendar year against the defending national champions Kansas Jayhawks. The purple-and-gold squad would fall behind early and not show any signs of life against the Jayhawks, in a 79–43 loss on nationally televised ESPNU.

Entering conference play the Danes had an 8–5 record before falling to 8–6 and 0–1 in the conference with a loss to Hartford Hawks, after heading home the team would rebound with a last second win against conference favorite Boston U. Terriers 62–61 and also giving coach Will Brown his 100th career victory as head coach of the team. Following Brown's 100th win, the team would win for the third consecutive time in Burlington, Vermont, beating the heavily favored Catamounts by a score of 82–77, the team would then return home to beat I-88 rival Binghamton by a score of 72–66. However the team would struggle down the remainder of the conference schedule, winning only 3 of their final 12 conference games.

With the America East Conference tournament at SEFCU Arena for the first time in Albany's 9-year history as a member of the conference; the Great Danes would head into the tournament as the #7 seed with a 6–10 conference record, and face the #2 seeded Catamounts yet again. Prior to the 2009 season the #7 seed had gone 0–23 in games against the #2 overall seed, however Albany would prevail and upset the higher seeded Catamounts 56–52, but would lose to UMBC in the semi-finals. Other tournament games included the #8–9 matchup in which the Hartford Hawks would beat Maine on Friday, March 6 to advance to a matchup against top-seeded Binghamton. The Bearcats would then beat the Hawks, and other semi-final games included UMBC upsetting the 3rd seeded Boston U. Terriers, and the UNH Wildcats would beat Stony Brook in the #4–5 matchup. The other Sunday semi-final matchup had #1 Binghamton beat #4 New Hampshire. Binghamton hosted UMBC on Saturday March 14 on ESPN2 for the 2009 Championship.

The 2012–13 and 2013–14 seasons: the year of the upsets
In 2012–13, the Great Danes would go 21–10 in the regular season. The season was highlighted by games against Top 10 ranked Ohio State and a 63–62 victory against the University of Washington in Seattle on November 13, 2012. Despite 21 wins, UAlbany had lost twice to regular season champions Stony Brook, regular season runner-up Vermont and third place Boston University, giving many fans limited faith in making a run for a conference title. However, the Great Danes would knock off Maine 50–49 and upset Stony Brook 61–59 in the 2013 Conference tournament, played at SEFCU Arena. On March 16, 2013, the Great Danes traveled to Vermont for a chance to win the AE Championship. Despite a 10–0 run by Vermont to start the game and being out-rebounded 34–20, the Great Danes pulled off the upset 53–49 to win the AE Championship and receive the conference automatic qualifier to the NCAA Tournament. It was the third straight victory for the Danes in the AE Championship game and the third time beating Vermont for the title. UAlbany became the first #4 seed to win the conference tournament.

The three-peat and "the shot"
The 2013–14 season had many ups and downs for the Great Danes. The Great Danes played near .500 basketball for the entire season. They would finish 15–14 on the regular season, 9–7 in conference play, ranked #4 going into the conference tournament. With the tournament being hosted on their home court, UAlbany cruised to a first round win over UMBC. In the semifinals, the Great Danes pulled off the upset vs. #1 seed Vermont 67–58. The Great Danes were then forced to travel to Stony Brook for the Championship Game. On March 15, 2014, the Great Danes would defeat Stony Brook 69–60 to win their second straight AE Title and fourth title in nine years. On March 18, Albany won its first ever NCAA tournament victory, 71–64 over Mount St. Mary’s in the First Four Round of the tournament. They would go on to lose to Florida in the 2nd Round

Despite winning back-to-back championships, the Great Danes were selected fourth in preseason polls. The Great Danes opened the season 2–6, but finished the regular season 19–2 (15–1 in America East play). The Great Danes went into the America East tournament as the #1 seed. UAlbany defeated Maine and squeaked by New Hampshire. They played Stony Brook at SEFCU Arena in a rematch of the previous year's championship. Stony Brook was the only conference team to beat the Danes during the regular season.

On March 14, 2015, in front of a sold out SEFCU Arena, the Great Danes defeated Stony Brook 51–50 to win their third straight conference title. The Great Danes won the game on a three-point shot by Peter Hooley with 1.6 seconds to go. "The Shot" gained national attention because of Hooley. Hooley, a native of Australia, left the team for nearly an entire month to be with his mother, who would sadly pass from colon cancer. Hooley stated after the game, "When you've got angels watching, you can do anything." Because of the game winning shot, Hooley and the Great Danes received national attention, as Hooley appeared on Sports Center and CBS' Road to March Madness Show. On March 20, 2015, The Great Danes fell to Oklahoma 69–60 in the second round of the 2015 NCAA basketball tournament.

Additional history
While not making the NCAA Tournament from the 2006–07 season to the 2012–13 season, the Great Danes did participate in a postseason tournaments. In 2011–12, UAlbany made the CIT Tournament, but lost to Manhattan in the first round. In 2016, they participated in the CBI Tournament, losing to Ohio in the first round in overtime.

In 2009, the University at Albany played host to its first America East Men's Basketball Championship at the 4,538-seat SEFCU Arena on campus. The America East brought the conference tournament back to SEFCU for the 2013 and 2014 Conference Championship.

Coaches

Current coaching staff
Head coach – Dwayne Killings
Assistant coach – Dannton Jackson
Assistant coach – Hamlet Tibbs
Assistant coach – Matt Griffin

All-time head coaches

Retired numbers

Honored

Notes

All-time records, standings, and statistics

Coaching records and standings

Postseason

NCAA Division I tournament results
The Great Danes have appeared in the NCAA Division I tournament five times. Their combined record is 1–5.

NCAA Division II tournament results
The Great Danes have appeared in the NCAA Division II tournament one time. Their record is 1–1.

NCAA Division III tournament results
The Great Danes have appeared in the NCAA Division III tournament ten times. Their combined record is 9–13.

CIT results
The Great Danes have appeared in the CollegeInsider.com Postseason Tournament (CIT) two times. Their combined record is 0–2.

CBI results
The Great Danes have appeared in the College Basketball Invitational (CBI) one time. Their record is 0–1.

References

External links